Research development (RD) is a set of strategic, proactive, catalytic, and capacity-building activities designed to facilitate individual faculty members, teams of researchers, and central research administrations in attracting extramural research funding, creating relationships, and developing and implementing strategies that increase institutional competitiveness. These activities are typically practiced at universities, but are also in use at a variety of other research institutions.

Research development includes a diverse set of dynamic activities that vary by institution.  These activities include initiating and nurturing partnerships, networks, and alliances between and among faculty at their institutions and funding agencies; and designing and implementing strategic services for their faculty and researcher constituents (such as workshops, trainings, program officer visits, proposal editing, PR communications, funding opportunity searches and dissemination, budget preparation, forms and submission assistance, research team building, and administering campus limited submission reviews).

Research development professionals initiate and nurture critical partnerships and alliances throughout the institutional research enterprise and between institutions and with their external stakeholders. With the goal of enabling competitive individual and team research and facilitating research excellence, research development professionals build and implement strategic services and collaborative resources that span across disciplinary and administrative barriers within their organizations and nothing  beyond.

Research development differs significantly from university development (institutional fundraising or advancement) in that RD is not aimed at attracting contributions or donations.  Rather, RD strengthens research programs and proposals to make them more competitive for extramural contracts and grants from governmental, private and non-profit funding agencies.  Similarly, RD should not be confused with research and development (R&D) which refers to investments in (often) corporate scientific and technological research that leads to new products and applications.

Recent contractions in the availability of public and private research funding have intensified competition for fewer resources among universities.  This trend has amplified the need for research development assistance and interventions at universities in order to enhance research excellence and competitiveness.  These services have not traditionally been offered through university-sponsored research and projects offices that administer the submission of grant proposals and research funds management.  In response to these challenges, research development is increasingly becoming a standard practice at universities, particularly research universities (defined, by the Carnegie Classification of Institutions of Higher Education, as universities that place a high priority on research and rely heavily on extramural funding).

According to the US-based National Organization of Research Development Professionals (NORDP), there are currently over 800 research development professionals employed at over 300 institutions (colleges/universities, teaching/not-for-profit hospitals, independent not-for-profit research organizations, national laboratories, research organizations wholly organized and administered by a college or university, consortia of colleges and universities, associations/societies with individual or institutional members predominantly from colleges and universities) across the United States and several foreign countries.

Activities
Strategic Research Advancement
 Collaborate to identify areas of institutional research priorities
 Strategic Planning Support (information to leadership about opportunities/strengths/weaknesses)
 Advise VP/VC for Research on issues related to research
 Serve as VPs/VCs for Research representative to university community and external visitors
 Manage or contribute to decisions regarding internal funding
 Provide research areas development support to include such things as formal partnerships with external entities or facilitating faculty participation
 Interactions with political leaders related to research initiatives at your institution
 Industry collaboration and partnerships
 Liaison with funding agencies about direction of future research funding initiatives
 Bringing Program Managers to Campus or taking/introducing Faculty to Program Managers
 Assisting with Sponsor Site visits
 Coordinating/Managing the limited submission process

Communication of Research and Research Opportunities
 Manage marketing of research, e.g. annual reports, research magazine, web page development/coordination, identifying institutional priorities
 Raise profile of university strengths that add to visibility or impact of university with external funding sources
 Providing proposal/award information related metrics to deans/chairs/faculty
 Website support e.g. grant opportunities and proposal development
 Collect and disseminate funding information to faculty and administrators
 Conducting Grant Writing Workshops on your campus or regionally

Enhancement of Collaboration/Team Science
 Convene and coordinate multi-disciplinary interest groups
 Catalyze new cross-disciplinary research initiatives
 Sponsoring catalytic research events, e.g. research mini-symposia
 Develop and/or coordinate resources and tools to promote collaboration
 Provide guidance and expertise for building and fostering connections and teams
 Maintain faculty expertise database and other collaboration web tools
 Facilitating collaborations between investigators at your own institution
 Facilitating collaborations between investigators at other institutions
 Manage the institution’s Research Networking Tool

Proposal Support Functions
Assisting faculty to find funding opportunities
 Liaison with funding agencies during proposal development process
 Newsletters/Listserv announcements of funding opportunities
 Maintain a file of successful proposals
 Assisting faculty navigate through administrative structures within your institution
 Proposal Development Support for large, center-like awards
 Proposal Development Support for individual investigator awards
 Project Management (coordinating milestones, internal deadlines, meetings, e-mail reminders, etc.)
 Grant Writing of Technical/Scientific portions of Application
 Grant Writing of Evaluation portions of Application
 Grant Writing of Resources portions of Application
 Grant Writing of Administrative portions of Application
 Grant Writing of Timeline portions of Application
 Grant Writing of Communications portions of Application
 Grant Writing of Outreach portions of Application
 Developing Budgets and budget justifications for application
 Handling Letters of Support/Biosketches/COI/Compliance/
 Developing Diversity Sections for Grant Proposals
 Developing RCR education Sections for Grant Proposals
 Coordinating/Finding Collaborating institutions for a proposal
 Suggesting collaborating scientists for a proposal
 Editing proposal drafts
 Manage requests for cost sharing
 Coordinating pre-submission peer reviews of proposal drafts
 Manage "Red Team" reviewers or external review process
 Proposal Submission Support (copying, mailing, pdf generation, etc.)
 Coordinating Core Facility information
 Assist with Just in Time or additional information requests from sponsor after proposal submission
 Assist with post-award set-up of project to get it off the ground and/or communicate with collaborators post-award.
 Analyze proposal reviews and provide feedback to investigators or other institutional officials

NORDP National Organization of Research Development Professionals
The National Organization of Research Development Professionals (NORDP) was established in 2010 as part of a grassroots movement to build a peer community of research development professionals. The organization grew from an informal network of over 100 individuals engaged in research development activities at universities and research institutions across the United States. The central goals of NORDP are to serve these professionals, by providing a formal organization to support their professional development, to enhance institutional research competitiveness, and to catalyze new research and institutional collaborations.

See also
 Science of team science

References

External links 
 National Organization of Research Development Professionals

development